Kinyongia adolfifriderici is a species of chameleon, a lizard in the family Chamaeleonidae. The species is native to central Africa and east Africa.

Geographic range
K. adolfifriderici is found in Burundi, northern and eastern Democratic Republic of the Congo, Rwanda, and Uganda.

Common names
Common names for K. adolfifriderici include the Ituri dwarf chameleon and the Ituri chameleon.

Etymology
The specific name adolfifriderici honours Duke Adolf Friedrich of Mecklenburg, leader of the German Central Africa Expedition in 1907–1908, during which the types were collected.

Habitat

Reproduction
K. adolfifriderici is oviparous.

References

Further reading
Spawls S, Howell K, Hinkel H, Menegon M (2018). Field Guide to East African Reptiles, Second Edition. London: Bloomsbury Natural History. 624 pp. . (Kinyongia adolfifriderici, p. 264).
Sternfeld R (1912). "Reptilia" pp. 197–280. In: Schubotz H (editor) (1912). Wissenschaftliche Ergebnisse der Deutschen Zentral-Afrikan-Expedition 1907–1908 unter Führing Adolf Friedrichs, Hertzogs zu Mecklenburg. Band IV. Zoologie II. Leipzig: Klinkhardt & Biermann. 485 pp. (Chameleon adolfi-friderici, new species, p. 258). (in German).

Kinyongia
Vertebrates of Burundi
Reptiles of the Democratic Republic of the Congo
Vertebrates of Rwanda
Reptiles of Uganda
Taxa named by Richard Sternfeld
Reptiles described in 1912